Nikiforos is a village and a former municipality in the Drama regional unit, of East Macedonia and Thrace, Greece. Since the 2011 local government reform, it has been a municipal unit of the municipality of Paranesti. The municipal unit has an area of 240.998 km2. The 2011 census reported a population of 2,805 inhabitants in the municipal unit and 296 in the village.

"Drama Köprüsü"
The Rumelia Turkish folk song "Drama Köprüsü" (Bridge Of Drama), is set near Nikiforos. The two- to three-century-old bridge has been located between Nikiforos and the nearby village of Karyafiton. Research was conducted by Nikos Latsistalis, the chairman of the Drama Asia Minor Refugees Association with the help of a Turkish refugee from Drama to Bursa.

Transport 

The settlement is served by Nikiforos railway station on the Thessaloniki-Alexandroupoli line, with daily services to Thessaloniki and Alexandroupolis.

People 
 Ibrahim Pasha of Egypt (1770–1848) Famous Albanian , is believed to have been born in Nikiforos, then Nusratli.
Nikiforos also refers to Pheidippides, the herald who ran from Marathon to Athens to inform the authorities that the Persians were defeated.
 Amina Hanim (Arabic: أمينة خانم‎; Turkish: Emine Hanım; 1770 – 1824) was the first princess consort of Muhammad Ali of Egypt, the first monarch of the Muhammad Ali dynasty.

References

External links 
 Bridge of Drama on Youtube

Populated places in Drama (regional unit)